A cooling bath or ice bath, in laboratory chemistry practice, is a liquid mixture which is used to maintain low temperatures, typically between 13 °C and −196 °C.  These low temperatures are used to collect liquids after distillation, to remove solvents using a rotary evaporator, or to perform a chemical reaction below room temperature (see Kinetic control).

Cooling baths are generally one of two types: (a) a cold fluid (particularly liquid nitrogen, water, or even air) — but most commonly the term refers to (b) a mixture of 3 components: (1) a cooling agent (such as dry ice or ice); (2) a liquid "carrier" (such as liquid water, ethylene glycol, acetone, etc.), which transfers heat between the bath and the vessel; (3) an additive to depress the melting point of the solid/liquid system.

A familiar example of this is the use of an ice/rock-salt mixture to freeze ice cream. Adding salt lowers the freezing temperature of water, lowering the minimum temperature attainable with only ice.

Mixed-solvent cooling baths 
Mixing solvents creates cooling baths with variable freezing points.  Temperatures between approximately −78 °C and −17 °C can be maintained by placing coolant into a mixture of ethylene glycol and ethanol, while mixtures of methanol and water span the −128 °C to 0 °C temperature range.  Dry ice sublimes at −78 °C, while liquid nitrogen is used for colder baths.

As water or ethylene glycol freeze out of the mixture, the concentration of ethanol/methanol increases.  This leads to a new, lower freezing point.  With dry ice, these baths will never freeze solid, as pure methanol and ethanol both freeze below −78 °C (−98 °C and −114 °C respectively).

Relative to traditional cooling baths, solvent mixtures are adaptable for a wide temperature range.  In addition, the solvents necessary are cheaper and less toxic than those used in traditional baths.

Traditional cooling baths

Water and ice baths 
A bath of ice and water will maintain a temperature 0 °C, since the melting point of water is 0 °C.  However, adding a salt such as sodium chloride will lower the temperature through the property of freezing-point depression.  Although the exact temperature can be hard to control, the weight ratio of salt to ice influences the temperature:
 −10 °C can be achieved with a 1:2.5 mass ratio of calcium chloride hemihydrate to ice.
 −20 °C can be achieved with a 1:3 mass ratio of sodium chloride to ice.

Dry ice baths at −78 °C 
Since dry ice will sublime at −78 °C, a mixture such as acetone/dry ice will maintain −78 °C. Also, the solution will not freeze because acetone requires a temperature of about −93 °C to begin freezing. Therefore, other liquids with a lower freezing point (pentane: −95 °C, isopropyl alcohol: −89 °C) can also be used to maintain the bath at −78 °C.

Dry ice baths above −77 °C 
In order to maintain temperatures above −77 °C, a solvent with a freezing point above −77 °C must be used.  When dry ice is added to acetonitrile, the bath will begin cooling.  Once the temperature reaches −41 °C, the acetonitrile will freeze.  Therefore, dry ice must be added slowly to avoid freezing the entire mixture.  In these cases, a bath temperature of −55 °C can be achieved by choosing a solvent with a similar freezing point (n-octane freezes at −56 °C).

Liquid-nitrogen baths above −196 °C 
Liquid-nitrogen baths follow the same idea as dry-ice baths. A temperature of −115 °C can be maintained by slowly adding liquid nitrogen to ethanol until it begins to freeze (at −116 °C).

Water/ice alternatives 
In water and ice-based baths, tap water is commonly used due to ease of access and the higher costs of using ultrapure water.  However, tap water and ice derived from tap water can be a contaminant to biological and chemical samples.  This has created a host of insulated devices aimed at creating a similar cooling or freezing effect as ice baths without the use of water or ice.

Safety recommendations 
The American Chemical Society notes that the ideal organic solvents to use in a cooling bath have the following characteristics:
 Nontoxic vapors.
 Low viscosity.
 Nonflammability.
 Low volatility.
 Suitable freezing point.
In some cases, a simple substitution can give nearly identical results while lowering risks.

See also 
 List of cooling baths
 Pumpable ice technology

References

Further reading

External links 
 
 

Laboratory techniques
Cryogenics
Cooling technology